Jorge Rosado (12 January 1939 – 9 June 2009) was a Mexican wrestler. He competed in the men's freestyle flyweight at the 1960 Summer Olympics.

References

1939 births
2009 deaths
Mexican male sport wrestlers
Olympic wrestlers of Mexico
Wrestlers at the 1960 Summer Olympics
Sportspeople from Mexico City
Pan American Games medalists in wrestling
Pan American Games silver medalists for Mexico
Wrestlers at the 1959 Pan American Games
Wrestlers at the 1963 Pan American Games
20th-century Mexican people
21st-century Mexican people